Naomh Conaill CLCG is a GAA club for the Glenties parish in south-west County Donegal. As well as the town of Glenties, the club also covers the area to the village of Fintown and the areas of Kilraine, The Glen and Maas down to the Gweebara Bridge. Much of this area lies within the Donegal Gaeltacht area. Martin Regan is the current football manager.

Naomh Conaill is one of the strongholds of Gaelic football in County Donegal, and are currently Senior Football Champions having beaten St Eunan’s in the 2022 Final.  They reached the final of the 2010 and 2019 Ulster Senior Club Football Championship.

History

Early history
The club was formed in 1921, before this time other sports were played in the area, especially association football (soccer). The earliest record of Gaelic games in the area came from 1905, when a hurling match took place between Kilraine and Brackey (Ardara). This predates the organisation of Donegal GAA in 1906, the foundation of which was influenced by Alex McDyer (he became secretary), who jointly arranged this 1905 match and played in the first recorded Donegal team in 1906. The club played its first match on 24 July 1921 between local teams - "The Town" and Kilraine. Friendly matches between Clady and Dungloe followed in the same year. A first appearance in the Donegal Senior Football Championship Final followed with a defeat to Castlefin - the score is uncertain according to the Donegal Democrat, but Castlefin won by 3 points. The following year the final between Ardara and Ballybofey was played in Glenties. From foundation to the late 1970s the club was usually referred to as Glenties (Na Gleanntaí) although through an amalgamation with the Fintown GAA club, it has since been referred to as Naomh Conaill.

Following this initial final appearance, the remainder of the 1920s did not yield any further documented success. However, there is a suggestion that the club did win a Junior football championship in 1928. The early 1930s saw the club suffer further county final defeats at the new Under 18 (Minor) Grade, losing to Letterkenny and in the first documented Junior county final in 1932 to Erin's Hope (Stranorlar) by a point. However success followed the next year in the Junior county final against Tamhnach na Mhullaigh, with the final score Na Gleanntai 0-2, Tamhnach na Mhullaigh 0-1. As well as these minor and junior finals, the club also contested the 1938 and 1939 minor finals - losing the former to St. Eunans by 2-2 to 1-3, but capturing the latter, its first County minor title on a score of 2-2 to Ballyshannon's 0-2.

1940–1959
At the start of the 1940s the club continued to feature in a number of county finals, and it could be argued reached a new peak in terms of the quality of teams on the field. In 1941 the club contested both the senior and minor county finals, but failed to capture either title. The senior final was lost by the narrowest of margins to Gweedore (Played in Dungloe); who at this time were a prominent force in Donegal Football contesting seven senior finals in the 1940s, losing only once.

The chance to contest another senior county final arose the following year (played in Ardara), but again luck was not on Glenties' side as Ballyshannon took the cup home. A few players from these teams wore the Green and Gold of Donegal in the  Ulster Senior Football Championship; notably Columba McDyre and Davy Brennan (after whom the club's home ground is named). Columba later gained further fame as the first Donegal man to win a Senior All-Ireland football winners medal, when he lined out for Cavan in the 1947 final played at the Polo Grounds in New York City.

1945 delivered further success with a second County Minor title secured at the expense of Gweedore with a scoreline of 0-9 to 1-5. The Minor final was reached once more in 1947, but a St. Eunans side on the 2nd leg of a three in a row were victorious. As the 1940s ended the club reached a sixth county decider, this time at the Junior grade, but were unsuccessful.

The 1950s were a lean period for the club, with no titles won. In 1957 St. Rian's Camogie club was formed in Glenties. They lost to Glenfin in their first game and later lost the junior championship semi-final to Castlefin.

1960–1970
The 1960s saw a second peak in the club's history with 10 finals contested across the decade. Following a final defeat in 1958; 1961 gave the club another chance at the U-16 crown, but defeat to Bundoran meant the wait would have to continue. The following year the club had some revenge against Bundoran by beating them to the 1962 Minor title by a score of 2-3 to 0-1. The club qualified for the 1963 minor final also but were unable to defend their title successfully, with Ballyshannon taking the title. This year also saw the club contest the Junior Championship final but Convoy took the cup. The following year yielded another success in the Junior Championship final, with victory over Castlefin with a score of (1-9 to 0-3). A first League division 2 title was secured in the 1963-64 season also. In 1964 the club won the Devine Cup hosted annually by Aghyaran St. Davogs's GFC.

Building on the successes at Minor and Junior grades the club qualified for its 4th appearance in the senior decider in 1965. In a very close run final the score ended up as a draw: Na Gleantaí 0-10, St.Josephs 1-7. Unfortunately the replay did not go the club's way and our wait for the big prize continued. NB - St. Josephs were an amalgamated team of Ballyshannon and Bundoran.

Following 1965, the club had to wait until 1968 to contest another county final, and a strong underage group of players ensured repeat visits to U-16 and Minor finals in the following years. A first Under 16 crown was secured in 1968. The following year, the club's bid to retain the title ended with a final defeat to Droim Barr. In the same year the club reached the minor final as part of a joint team with neighbours (and local rivals) Ardara - the amalgamated team winning by eight points. This team then successfully defended the title in 1970 by defeating Buncrana.

1971–1989
The club's strong underage teams were again prominent in the early seventies. 1971 saw two finals contested by Na Gleanntaí, with mixed success. The U-16 team won the club's second county title at this grade, comprehensively defeating Urris. The second final of 1971 was at the U-21 grade (the first year this grade was played), but Gweedore took the title by 2 points. 1972 saw the club contest the Democrat Cup Final (Division 1 league) for the first time, but St. Josephs took the title. Underage teams came to the fore again in 1973 as the club reached the U-14 and U-16 finals, but no victories were secured.

A first Senior football title for the club was won in 1974 with the capture of the Donegal Senior Comórtas Peile na Gaeltachta - Naomh Conaill were however unsuccessful at the All-Ireland Comórtas Peile na Gaeltachta in that year. In that same year a second appearance in the U-21 final was gained, but Kilcar ran out winners. A first appearance in an U-12 final occurred in 1976, and a single point gained Ballyshannon the title. A wait of 8 years led to the next county final appearance, this time at U-14. A strong St. Eunans team were the victors in Ballybofey (as in 1973). At this time the club's senior (first team) were playing in the Intermediate championship, and 1986 saw a final appearance against Dungloe in Ardara. Despite a good performance Dungloe took the cup. After a long wait since 1974 the club started to see some success in the late 1980s. A second League division 2 title was secured in the 1988 campaign, with a Division 3 shield following the next year.

The mid-1980s had seen the creation of 'B' Championships at U-12 and U-14 grades, and these new competitions gave the club new opportunity to develop its underage teams following a fallow period. In the second year of the U-14B Championship (1988), Naomh Conaill won the trophy, beating Termon in Ballybofey. The following year the U-12B Championship was also won after a replay in the old O'Donnell Park, Letterkenny. The first game with Buncrana finished all square at 2-3 each.

In the late 1980s the club also fielded a camogie team, who won 2 County Intermediate titles in 1988 by 1-0 to 0-0 (against Four Masters) and in 1989 by 3-1 to 2-1 (against Glenfin) in Glenfin.

1990–1999
A landmark was reached for the club in 1990 with victory in the Intermediate Championship Final, a first county championship victory for the senior team over Bundoran. Another shield division 2 title was added in 1992. As well as being the year Donegal captured Sam for the first time, 1992 also saw Naomh Conaill capture an all-Ireland title in Scór na-nÓg; in the ballad group category. The team was composed of Shauna Ward, Eileen Rafferty, Tara Connaghan, Helena Bonner, Brenda Mc Elhinney and mentored by Jim Rafferty.

The mid-nineties marked the start of an upturn in the club's fortunes, initially at underage level. By 1995 the "B" championships had been renamed A2 championships and the club secured both the Minor A2 and the U-12 A2 Championships at the expense of Kilcar and Glenfin after a replay (first game ended 2-9 to 3-6) respectively. . The club experienced mixed fortunes in 1997 losing the U-14 A2 Championship to Downings, but winning the U-13 A2 at the expense of Fanad Gaels.

A first shield division 1 was secured in 1995, and more significantly, success in the Senior Donegal Gaeltacht Championship was gained in the following year. A long-awaited return to success in the premier championship grades was fulfilled in 1998, when the club secured a first U-12 Championship, beating near neighbours Ardara. This was followed by a hat trick of Óg-sport Gael titles in 1999, 2000 and 2001.

2000–2009
There is no argument that the current era is the most successful in the club's history, with a number of fine footballers wearing the blue jersey at all age grades. The pinnacle being the capture of the Dr. Maguire Cup (Donegal Senior Football Championship) in 2005 for the first time. During the first decade of the 21st century the club contested county finals in each year, with unparalleled success at various grades.

Building on the underage success of the late nineties; the club enjoyed continued good fortunes, capturing the U-12 A2 and óg-spórt county titles in successive years. In both 2000 and 2001, the club also contested finals at Minor A2, U-14 (2000) and U-16 (2001) without success. 2002 saw Naomh Conaill contest their second democrat cup final; and this time the cup was secured for the first time at the expense of St. Eunans. The following year saw the capture of the club's first Minor league (A1) title, but a first appearance in the senior reserve championship final ended in defeat to Gweedore. However, a first Minor championship as a single club since 1962; was achieved in this year.

2004 saw the club retain the minor championship, the first time a top grade football championship was held for more than one year (excluding combined teams). As mentioned previously, Naomh Conaill's finest hour was in 2005, with a first senior championship football title, at the fifth time of asking. It was a long time coming and the area has probably never celebrated a success as whole heartedly as they did this one. The club's first appearance in the Ulster club Championship ended at Mayobridge (Co. Down), Score: Mayobridge 0-10 Naomh Conaill 1-05.

The success of 2005 gave way to an unprecedented five county finals in 2006, disappointingly only 1 success came at U-21 level (defeats came in the Senior reserve, Minor, U-13 and league division 1B). The second installment of an U-21 three-in-a-row was gained in 2007, as was a second Minor A1 league title. In the minor championship Naomh Conaill were unable to overcome the challenge of Four Masters. St. Eunan's were the victors in the U-16 decider. More records were broken the following year with a third U-21 Championship in three years.

A sixth appearance in the senior championship county final in 2009, ended in defeat to St. Eunan's. This disappointment aside, 2009 was a vintage year with county titles at Minor and U-12, and final defeats in the U-21 (thus denying a four in a row), Minor league and division 5 county final. The minor team lost out at the quarter final stage of the Ulster Club Championship to Belcoo after extra time. As 2009 closed, following a club record 6 county finals, the club has indeed come a long way in the last 89 years.

2010–present
They won the 2010 Donegal Senior Football Championship, with Leo McLoone in inspired form. They beat Killybegs in the final at MacCumhaill Park, Ballybofey. Then they beat Cavan champions Kingscourt in the Ulster Championship preliminary round and beat Monaghan champions Clontibret O'Neills in the first round proper to set up a semi-final against Tyrone champions Coalisland.

In 2012 Naomh Conaill were once again in the county final against old foes Letterkenny. In an even game that was perhaps edged by Naomh Conaill on the pitch the club was narrowly beaten by a point after a late Mark McGowan 45.

In 2015 Naomh Conaill again contested the County Final against St. Eunans by a single point. This time they did not disappoint as they atoned for losses to the same team in 2009 and 2012. Unfortunately, the club was beaten in the first round of the Ulster Championship by Tyrone champions Trillick.

In 2016 naomh conaill minors won the county championship against st eunans by 1-11 to 0-11 in convoy.

Club grounds
The club has used a number of different playing fields in its history before establishing the current Davy Brennan Memorial Park club grounds at Carrickbrack 1971. The club has hosted the Donegal Senior Football Championship final on 12 occasions (1923,28,31,35,37,38,44,49,51,55,57,73).

Notable players

 Columba McDyer — 1947 All-Ireland Senior Football Championship winner (with Cavan)
 Marty Boyle — 2012 All-Ireland Senior Football Championship winner
 Paddy Campbell — 2007 National Football League winner
 Thomas Donoghue — 2007 National Football League winner
 Jim McGuinness
 Leo McLoone — 2012 All-Ireland Senior Football Championship winner
 Dermot Molloy — 2012 All-Ireland Senior Football Championship winner
 Ethan O'Donnell 
 Anthony Thompson — 2012 All-Ireland Senior Football Championship winner
 Ciarán Thompson 
 Leon Thompson — 2007 National Football League winner and 2014 All-Ireland Senior Football Championship runner-up
 Eoin Waide

Managers

Chairmen
The following men have been chairman of the club.

Table of County Final results

Honours
Football
 Donegal Senior Football Championship: 2005, 2010, 2015, 2019, 2020, 2022
 Donegal Senior Football League (Democrat Cup): 2002, 2012
 Donegal Intermediate Football Championship: 1990
 Donegal Junior Football Championship:  1933, 1964
 Donegal Senior Football League Div. 2: 1963–64, 1977, 1988
 Donegal Football Shield Div. 1: 1995
 Donegal Football Shield Div. 2: 1992
 Donegal Football Shield Div. 3: 1989
 Donegal Under-21 Football Championship: 2006, 2007, 2008, 2010, 2012
 Donegal Under-18 [Minor] Football Championship: 1939, 1945, 1962, 1969, 1970, 2003, 2004, 2009, 2016
 Donegal Under-18 A2 Football Championship: 1995
 Donegal Minor Football Leagues: 2003, 2007, 2016 (Regional and Divisional)
 Donegal Under-16 Football Championship: 1968, 1971
 INTO 7-aside Football skills: 1990
 Óg Spórt Gaels: 1999, 2000, 2001
 Donegal Under-14B Football Championship: 1988
 Donegal Under-13 A2 Football Championship: 1997
 Donegal Under-12 Football Championship: 1998, 2009
 Donegal Under-12 A2 [formerly B] Football Championship: 1989, 1995, 2000, 2001
 Comórtas Peile na Gaeltachta Dhún na nGall - Sinsír: 1974, 1996, 2015, 2022
 Comórtas Peile na Gaeltachta na hÉireann - Sinsír: 2015, 2016
 Glen McGinty Cup [Junior Football]: 1990

Camogie
 Donegal Intermediate Camogie Championship: 1988, 1989

Notes

References

External links
 Glenties.ie
 Donegal Southern Regional GAA Board
 Donegal Image Gallery
 Donegal Democrat Archive
 Preliminary round Ulster Club Championship 2010 Youtube highlights
 "'Jim McGuinness introduced me to the panel and said, 'He'll be playing for the next 20 years': As Naomh Conaill prepare for Sunday's Ulster final, Leo McLoone reflects on his career with the Glenties club", The42.ie, 27 November 2019

1921 establishments in Ireland
Gaelic games clubs in County Donegal
Gaelic football clubs in County Donegal
Glenties